The Crimson Permanent Assurance is a 1983 British swashbuckling comedy short film that plays as the beginning of the feature-length motion picture Monty Python's The Meaning of Life.

Having originally conceived the story as a six-minute animated sequence in Monty Python's The Meaning of Life, intended for placement at the end of Part V, Terry Gilliam convinced the other members of Monty Python to allow him to produce and direct it as a live action piece instead. According to Gilliam, the film's rhythm, length, and style of cinematography made it a poor fit as a scene in the larger movie, so it was presented as a supplementary short ahead of the film.

It was a common practice in British cinemas to show an unrelated short feature before the main movie, a holdover from the older practice of showing a full-length "B" movie ahead of the main feature. By the mid-1970s the short features were of poorer quality (often Public Information Films), or simply banal travelogues. As a kind of protest, the Pythons had already produced one spoof travelogue narrated by John Cleese, Away from It All, which was shown before Life of Brian in Britain.

The film includes actor Matt Frewer's debut performance.

Plot
The elderly British employees of the Permanent Assurance Company, a staid London firm which has recently been taken over by the Very Big Corporation of America (VBCA), rebel against their much younger corporate masters when one of them is sacked. Having locked the surviving supervisors in the safe, and forced their boss to walk a makeshift plank out a window, they commandeer their Edwardian office building, which suddenly weighs anchor, uses its scaffolding and tarpaulins as sails, and is turned into a pirate ship. The stone office building starts to move as if it were a ship. Sailing through the City of London, they then proceed to attack the VBCA's skyscraper, using, among other things, wooden filing cabinets which have been transformed into carronades and swords fashioned from the blades of a ceiling fan. On ropes, they swing into the board room and engage the executives of VBCA in hand-to-hand combat, vanquishing them.

After their hard-earned victory, the clerks sing a heroic sea shanty as they "sail the wide accountan-sea" in search of further conquests. However, they unceremoniously end up falling off the edge of the world, due to their belief about the shape of the world being "disastrously wrong".

Typical of how the Pythons would weave previously "terminated" plot lines into later scenes in their projects (such "The Spanish Inquisition" in Flying Circus, or the repeated references to swallows in Holy Grail), The Crimson Permanent Assurance suddenly re-emerges in the middle of The Meaning of Life. After the donor scene, the film shifts to a modern boardroom in the VBCA headquarters, where the executives debate about the meaning of life (and whether or not people are wearing enough hats). The debate is halted when one executive asks "Has anyone noticed that building there before?", which turns out to be the office building/pirate ship of the Crimson Permanent Assurance. As the beginning of the battle between the clerks and the VBCA is repeated, the raid is suddenly halted by a falling skyscraper crushing the Permanent Assurance Company building, accompanied by a voice-over apologizing for the "unwarranted attack by the supporting feature".

Cast

Pirates
 Sydney Arnold
 Myrtle Devenish
 Eric Francis
 Len Marten
 John Scott Martin
 Gareth Milne
 Paddy Ryan
 Leslie Sarony
 Wally Thomas

Very Big Corporation of America
 Ross Davidson
 Matt Frewer
 Terry Jones
 Graham Chapman
 Eric Idle
 Michael Palin
 Terry Gilliam

In popular culture
The Crimson Permanent Assurance plays a prominent role in Charles Stross's 2013 novel Neptune's Brood, where the CPA is an interstellar insurance company that sponsors space pirates who double as cargo auditors. The CPA also features in the novel's twist ending.

References

External links
 
 Companies owned by The Very Big Corporation of America

1983 comedy films
1983 short films
1983 films
Short films directed by Terry Gilliam
Films scored by John Du Prez
Films set in 1983
Films set in London
Monty Python films
Pirate films
Films with screenplays by Terry Gilliam
British comedy short films
Films shot at EMI-Elstree Studios
1980s English-language films
1980s British films